Transoeste is a bus rapid transit (BRT) line stretching from Barra da Tijuca to Santa Cruz, with a branch to Campo Grande. TransOeste was the first line to open in the Rio de Janeiro BRT system. The corridor was a transformation of the Avenida das Américas to expand the carriageways for exclusive use of high capacity buses, the BRT (Bus Rapid Transit), with transfer stations in the median, and also included the construction of the Grota Funda Tunnel. The Transoeste corridor was inaugurated on June 6, 2012.

See also
Bus Rapid Transit in Brazil
Implementation of bus rapid transit by country
List of bus rapid transit systems
Transcarioca

References

External links

TransOeste